Krishnan Kutty Nair may refer to:

 Krishnan Kutty Nair (actor), Malayalam comedy artist
 Kottakkal Krishnan Kutty Nair, veteran Kathakali artist and teacher